Aviel is a moshav in northern Israel. It is located south of Haifa within Alona Regional Council, near Zikhron Yaakov and Binyamina-Giv'at Ada.

History

The moshav was established by the Herut party in 1949 and named after Israel "Aviel" Epstein, an Irgun envoy to Rome, who was killed in Italy on 28 December 1946. Its original name was Yad HaYod-Daled, after the fourteen Irgun members who died fighting the British.

It is located on the land of the depopulated Palestinian village of Al-Sindiyana, southwest of the village site.

References

Moshavim
Populated places established in 1949
Populated places in Haifa District
1949 establishments in Israel